Palai Japan village(Palai Kya Pan; , B̀x ỵī̀pùn)Jack Pan Ye Dwin,() is located in Burma, Kayin State, Kawkareik District, it is located in Payathonzu sub-township, near the demarcated Thai-Burmese border. It is about 3 miles from Payathonzu and Palai Japan. During the Japanese occupation, it was known as a Japanese military base in Kanchanaburi military history, it is now the headquarters of the New Mon State Party.

References 

Populated places in Kayin State